George Leonard was an American author and pioneer in the Human Potential Movement

George Leonard may also refer to:

 George Leonard (colonial administrator) (c.1655-c. 1735), British Deputy Governor of Anguilla
 George Leonard (congressman) (1729–1819), U.S. congressman from Massachusetts
 George Leonard (New Brunswick) (1742–1826), Canadian farmer, New Brunswick politician
 George Leonard Jr. (died 1818), Canadian lawyer and political figure
 George B. Leonard (1872–1956), American attorney
 George Hare Leonard (1863–1941), professor of history
 George Leonard (ice hockey) (1886–1917), Canadian ice hockey player